Tonight's Music is a song by Swedish band Katatonia, released in 2001 as the only single from their fifth studio album Last Fair Deal Gone Down.

Track listing

Note
 "O How I Enjoy The Light" is cover version of Will Oldham.

Personnel 
Katatonia
 Jonas Renkse – vocals
 Anders Nyström – guitar, keyboards
 Fredrik Norrman – guitar
 Mattias Norrman – Bass guitar
 Daniel Liljekvist – Drums, percussion

Production
Tomas Skogsberg – engineer
Jocke Petterson – engineer
Jonas Kjellgren – engineer
Travis Smith – production, design

2001 singles
Albums with cover art by Travis Smith (artist)